Seth Dennis Rudetsky (born February 28, 1967) is an American musician, actor, writer and radio host. He currently is the host of Seth's Big Fat Broadway and Seth Speaks on Sirius/XM Satellite Radio's On Broadway. The show focuses on Rudetsky's knowledge of Broadway theatre history and trivia.

In March 2020, Rudetsky and his husband created a daily live-streamed web series Stars in The House to benefit The Actors Fund in the wake of the coronavirus pandemic.

Early life and education

Rudetsky grew up in North Woodmere, New York. He graduated from Hewlett High School in Hewlett, New York, and Oberlin College Conservatory of Music in 1988 with a degree in Piano Performance.

Career

Acting

He wrote and performed in a one-man show called Rhapsody in Seth in 2003. He often tours with variations on his one-man show. He appeared in the Series Finale of Kathy Griffin: My Life on the D-List. From November 27 through December 10, 2006, he starred in an Off-Off-Broadway production of Torch Song Trilogy.

He appeared in the Roundabout Theatre Company revival of The Ritz from September 2007 through December 2007. Also in 2007, Rudetsky appeared as a contestant on Episode #111 of the US version of Cash Cab. He also appeared in the MTV reality show Legally Blonde: The Musical – The Search for Elle Woods as a vocal coach for the contestants throughout the competition. He appeared in January 2008 in a regional production (Northport, Long Island, New York) of Lend Me a Tenor.

On August 30, 2010, Rudetsky appeared with two-time Tony-winner Sutton Foster in a one-night-only concert performance of They're Playing Our Song at the Gerald W. Lynch Theater. On June 18, 2012. On Thursday evenings, he hosts Seth's Broadway Chatterbox, a one-hour talk show, at a New York City club, Don't Tell Mama on 46th Street.

Rudetsky started a website called SETH TV. The site had archives of video and a $5/month subscription fee for exclusive content. Rudetsky posts video "deconstructions" to his web site in which he deconstructs the singing voices of Broadway performers.

On November 4, 2013, Disaster!, a musical comedy starring Rudetsky and written by both Rudetsky and Jack Plotnick, opened Off-Broadway at the St. Luke's Theatre. The show, which parodies 1970's disaster movies, has earned largely positive reviews, with The New York Times praising its "inspired lunacy". After a three-year run off-Broadway, Disaster! opened at the Nederlander Theatre on Broadway in 2016.

Writing

Rudetsky was nominated for the Emmy Award three times for his work as a comedy writer for The Rosie O'Donnell Show. He was a writer for the Grammy Award shows of 1999 and 2000. Rudetsky also wrote the opening number for seven Broadway Cares/Equity Fights AIDS Easter Bonnet Competitions and has been responsible for many of their Gypsy Of The Year shows.

Rudetsky had his short story "My First Story" included in the 2005 anthology Fresh Men 2: New Voice in Gay Fiction. The next year, his book The Q Guide to Broadway was published by Alyson Books. This was followed in 2007 by the release of his novel Broadway Nights, also published by Alyson Books. In 2012, his first young adult novel, My Awesome/Awful Popularity Plan, was published by Random House. In 2015, he released a sequel, The Rise and Fall of a Theater Geek, also published by Random House.

Musicianship
In addition to being a writer and an authority on the music of the Broadway stage, Rudetsky is also an accomplished musician. Having majored in Piano Performance at Oberlin, he has gone on to perform in a variety of shows, including accompanying Patti LuPone in concert, where he also demonstrated a talent for on-sight transposition. In addition, Rudetsky has also displayed a skill for conducting, leading the orchestra for the November 30, 2007, special performance "Light the Lights--Broadway is Back" end-of-the-strike celebration.

Rudetsky also composed the opening numbers for the 1998 and 2000 Tony Awards.

Personal life 
Rudetsky is gay. He married producer James Wesley in 2012 and they have a daughter, Juli.

His brother Michael Rudetsky died at Boy George's London mansion in 1986. The cause was reportedly heroin overdose, although no drug paraphernalia was found at the scene. Michael was 27 years old and a well-respected musician in pop music circles when he died. He was a keyboardist, guitarist and writer who had worked with Cyndi Lauper, Kool & the Gang, and Joan Jett.

References

External links 
 Seth TV Network
 Rudetsky's Broadway Chatterbox
 Rhapsody in Seth

talkinbroadway.com interview, ca. 2007

1967 births
American male journalists
American radio personalities
American gay actors
American gay writers
George W. Hewlett High School alumni
Jewish American journalists
Jewish American male actors
Jewish American musicians
LGBT Jews
American LGBT musicians
American LGBT screenwriters
Living people
Male actors from New York (state)
Musicians from New York (state)
Oberlin Conservatory of Music alumni
People from North Woodmere, New York
Place of birth missing (living people)
Radio personalities from New York (state)
21st-century American Jews